Kirkpatrick is an unincorporated community in Madison Township, Montgomery County, in the U.S. state of Indiana.

History
Kirkpatrick was laid out in 1882. A post office was established at Kirkpatrick in 1881, and remained in operation until it was discontinued in 1931.

Geography

References

Unincorporated communities in Montgomery County, Indiana
Unincorporated communities in Indiana